The Cadeby Light Railway was a  narrow-gauge railway in the garden of the rectory in Cadeby, Leicestershire.

In the early 1960s the Reverend Teddy Boston became rector of All Saints' Church, Cadeby. Boston was a lifelong railway enthusiast and wanted to build a miniature railway in his new garden, but the cost proved prohibitive. Instead he searched for a full-sized narrow-gauge locomotive. 

In 1962, he purchased Pixie, a W.G. Bagnall  from the Cranford quarry. The quarry owners donated a short length of track and two wagons and the Cadeby Light Railway was opened.

Over the years, Boston built an extensive collection of ex-industrial narrow-gauge rolling stock which ran on the extremely short line in his garden. He also maintained an extensive OO gauge model railway at Cadeby.

Although Boston died in 1986, his widow, Audrey kept the railway open for nearly twenty years, holding regular open days. 

The railway finally closed in 2005. The majority of the collection has been amalgamated with the Moseley Railway Trust at the Apedale Community Country Park. Pixie is currently undergoing restoration as of 2014.

Collection

In 1982, Boston's collection consisted of:

See also
 Moseley Railway Trust
 British narrow-gauge railways

References 

 

Specific

External links

The Rev. Edwin Richard "Teddy" Boston – an appreciation – by Mike Rooth
Steam rally appearance by "Fiery Elias"
Photo of the Rev. Boston on 'Pixie', with All Saints' Church behind
"Railway Vicar" (free video download) – April 1967 feature by British Pathe about Teddy Boston and his OO gauge model railway.
Teddy Boston's involvement in the forming of the Cadeby Steam & Country Fayre

2 ft gauge railways in England
Railway lines opened in 1963
Railway lines closed in 2005